The Woman at the Crossroads (German: Die Frau am Scheidewege) is a 1938 German drama film directed by Josef von Báky and starring Ewald Balser, Magda Schneider and Karin Hardt. It was made partly at the Hunnia Film Studios in Budapest. The film's sets were designed by the art director Emil Hasler.

Synopsis
After a failed marriage to an artist, a young female doctor returns to her rightful place in the hospital.

Cast
 Ewald Balser as Prof. Henrici 
 Magda Schneider as Dr.med. Hanna Weigand  
 Karin Hardt as Elinor Weigand 
 Hans Söhnker as Fred Moebius 
 Ilse Furstenberg as Frau Pawlowski 
 Paul Westermeier as Johann  
 Georg Alexander as Herrenguth  
 Willi Schur as Pawlowski - Arbeiter  
 Ernst Waldow as Von Dieter 
 Margarete Schön as Oberschwester Hermine  
 Peter Elsholtz as Brandes  
 Gustav Püttjer as Schaffner  
 Eduard Wenck as Patient 
 Hilde Maroff as Patientin  
 Vera Hartegg as Empfangsschwester  
 Peter Bosse as Pawlowskis Sohn  
 Lidia Beöthy as Nachtschwester 
 Rudolf Schündler as Graup

References

Bibliography 
 Hake, Sabine. Popular Cinema of the Third Reich. University of Texas Press, 2001.

External links 
 

1938 films
1938 drama films
German drama films
Films of Nazi Germany
1930s German-language films
Films directed by Josef von Báky
Films with screenplays by Thea von Harbou
Terra Film films
German black-and-white films
1930s German films